Favartia varimutabilis is a species of sea snail, a marine gastropod mollusk in the family Muricidae, the murex snails or rock snails.

Description

Distribution
This species occurs in the Atlantic Ocean off Southeast Brazil.

References

 Espinosa J. & Ortea J. (2017). Dos nuevas especies de la familia Muricidae Rafinesque, 1815 (Mollusca: Neogastropoda) de la isla de Martinica, Antillas Menores. Avicennia. 20: 41-44.
 Garrigues B. & Lamy D. (2019). Inventaire des Muricidae récoltés au cours de la campagne MADIBENTHOS du MNHN en Martinique (Antilles Françaises) et description de 12 nouvelles espèces des genres Dermomurex, Attilosa, Acanthotrophon, Favartia, Muricopsis et Pygmaepterys (Mollusca, Gastropoda). Xenophora Taxonomy. 23: 22-59.

External links
 Houart R. (1991). The southeastern Brazilian Muricidae collected by RV Marion-Dufresne in 1987, with the description of three new species. The Nautilus. 105(1): 26-37

Gastropods described in 1991
Favartia